

"Kaby Lake-S" (14 nm) 
 All models support: ''MMX, SSE, SSE2, SSE3, SSSE3, SSE4.1, SSE4.2, AVX, AVX2, FMA3, F16C, BMI1 (Bit Manipulation Instructions1), BMI2, MPX, SGX, Enhanced Intel SpeedStep Technology (EIST), Intel 64, XD bit (an NX bit implementation), TXT, Intel vPro, Intel VT-x, Intel VT-d, Hyper-threading (except E3-1220 v6, E3-1225 v6), Turbo Boost 2.0, AES-NI, Smart Cache, TSX-NI, ECC memory

Xeon E3-12xx v6 (uniprocessor)

"Kaby Lake-H" (14 nm)

Xeon E3-15xx v6 (uniprocessor)

References 

 
 
 
 
 
 
 

Intel Xeon (Kaby Lake)